Løvenørn, also spelled de Løvenørn, was a Danish and Norwegian noble family.

History

Poul Vendelbo (1686–1740) was on the 14th of January 1711 ennobled under the name Løvenørn (lit. Lion Eagle). Among his descendants were  his son  Frederik de Løvenørn (1715-1779) and grandson, naval officer and hydrographer Poul de Løvenørn (1751-1826). Later generations included diplomat Poul Ludvig Ernst de Løvenørn  (1839-1922).

Gallery

Coat of arms
Description: In a shield divided into a yellow field and a red field by a downwards turned sword, in the 1st field an against left [sinister?] directed blue lion rampant, holding the sword, and in the 2nd field a crowned gold double eagle. On the helm a noble coronet, whereupon an eight-pointed golden star between two arms dressed in armour, each holding a downwards turned sable.

See also
 Danish nobility
 Norwegian nobility

References

Literature and sources
 Wikipedia, Danish.
 Poul Bredo Grandjean (1915): Løvenørn

 
Danish noble families
Norwegian noble families